Temple of Juno is commonly used to refer to the following Roman and Greek temples dedicated to the goddess Juno

 Temple of Juno Moneta on the Capitoline Hill in Rome
 Temple of Juno at Acragas, Sicily
 Tas-Silġ, an archaeological site in Marsaxlokk, Malta containing the remains of a temple of Juno

See also
 Temple of Hera